The Company of Public Relations Practitioners is a company without livery in the City of London, and was granted this status in 2013.  The Company was formed in 2000 as the Guild of Public Relations Practitioners to represent the public relations profession and for charitable purposes.

The Company aims to achieve a grant of livery to become a livery company.

See also
Chartered Institute of Public Relations

References

External links
Website

Organizations established in 2000